Drag City is an American independent record label based in Chicago, Illinois. Established in the city in 1990 by Dan Koretzky and Dan Osborn, its first release was a Royal Trux single ("Hero Zero" - DC1). It specializes in indie rock, noise rock, psychedelic folk, alternative country, and experimental music. The label has featured numerous critically acclaimed artists, including Bonnie 'Prince' Billy, Bill Callahan, Joanna Newsom, and Silver Jews.

History
The label released the US version of Scott Walker's Tilt in 1997, after the label approached him wishing to give the album a US release. Walker described releasing the album on the indie label as "an experiment". Several members of Drag City's staff have played in bands; press-chief Gene Booth played keyboards and guitar in USA, and Booth, head of sales Rian Murphy, and founder Dan Koretzky all played in Mantis. Booth was also a member of Chestnut Station.

In recent years, they have expanded their catalog to include alternative comedy releases, with recent outputs from Fred Armisen, Neil Hamburger, and Andy Kaufman among others, and reissues, notably by Gary Higgins and Death. In 1997, Drag City began publishing printed works such as the literary magazine The Minus Times and Neil Hagerty's novel Victory Chimp. The label distributed the 2013 documentary The Source Family. After years of refusing to release its artists' music on streaming platforms, the label finally made its music available for streaming via Apple Music in July 2017.

Roster

AZITA
Bachelorette
Baby Dee
William Basinski
Richard Bishop
Blues Control
Bill Callahan
Cave
Cynthia Dall
Chris Darrow
Circuit Des Yeux
Death
Dope Body
Espers
Faun Fables
Flying Saucer Attack
Mark Fosson
Edith Frost
The Fucking Champs
Loose Fur
Ghost
David Grubbs
Neil Michael Hagerty
The Howling Hex
John Mulaney & the Sack Lunch Bunch
Liimanarina
Magik Markers
Monotonix
Movietone
Mickey Newbury
Joanna Newsom
Scout Niblett
Nig-Heist
Will Oldham (Bonnie "Prince" Billy, Palace Music, etc.)
Jim O'Rourke
The High Llamas
Papa M
Pavement
Pearls and Brass
Pearls Before Swine
Jessica Pratt
Purple Mountains
The Red Krayola
The Renderers
Alasdair Roberts
Royal Trux
RTX
Lætitia Sadier
Ty Segall
Sic Alps
Silver Jews
Six Organs of Admittance
Stereolab
Sun Araw
U.S. Maple
Scott Walker
Wand
Weird War
White Magic
Michael Yonkers

See also
 List of record labels

References

External links
 Official site

American independent record labels
Record labels established in 1990
Indie rock record labels
Experimental music record labels
Companies based in Chicago
1990 establishments in Illinois